Eliseé Sou (born 21 October 1999) is a Burkinabé footballer who currently plays as a defender for SOL Abobo.

Career statistics

International

References

1999 births
Living people
Burkinabé footballers
Burkinabé expatriate footballers
Burkina Faso international footballers
Association football defenders
Rahimo FC players
Burkinabé Premier League players
Burkinabé expatriate sportspeople in Ivory Coast
Expatriate footballers in Ivory Coast
21st-century Burkinabé people
Burkina Faso A' international footballers
2018 African Nations Championship players